Āghā Ali-Akbar Farāhāni was a notable and well known musician of  Persian Traditional Music and Tar and Setar player during the last century in Persia. He was leading the musicians in the court of Naser al-Din Shah in the early years of Naser al-Din Shah`s reign. He was the father of two significant musicians, Mirza Abdollah and Mirza Hossein Gholi, and the paternal grandfather of another outstanding musician, Ahmad Ebadi, Mirza Abdollah's son and Ali Akbar Shahnazi. He died in Iran in 1862 January.

References 
Farahani, Mehdi, A glimpse to Agha AliAkbar's life, Mahoor Music Quarterly, Vol.21, No 82, Winter 2019, P. 100
Haghighat, A., Honarmandan e Irani az Aghaz ta Emrooz, Koomesh Publication, 2004, (in Persian)
Khaleghi, R., Sargozasht e Musighi e Iran, Ferdowsi Publication, 1955, (in Persian)
1Iran submits two documents for registration on UNESCO list, Tehran Times.

Iranian tar players
Year of death missing
Year of birth missing
Qajar courtiers
19th-century Iranian musicians